Chanda Rigby (born April 16, 1968) is an American basketball coach.  Since 2012, she has been the head coach of the Troy Trojans women's basketball team.

Head coaching record

NJCAA

NCAA

References

1968 births
Living people
People from Franklinton, Louisiana
American women's basketball coaches
Troy Trojans women's basketball coaches